Pogle is a color grading system manufactured by Pandora International in the UK. Usually combined with Revolution, MegaDEF or a Pixi image processing components.

Pogle may also refer to:
Pogle bait or snack food, a military term for snacks

See also
Pogles' Wood, an animated British children's television series
Pogled (disambiguation)
Pogled ispod obrva an album by Severina